O'Cayz Corral was a downtown Madison, Wisconsin bar and music venue that primarily featured local and national punk, rock, and grunge musical acts.

History 
Located in Madison, Wisconsin, United States, O'Cayz Corral was originally named Don's Shell (Owned by Don & Cay Millard) and later renamed Millard's Bar. Catherine "Cay" Millard became sole owner of the tavern in 1980 and changed the name to O'Cayz Corral, a country-western themed bar with a legal capacity of 150. Sometime in the early 80's Cay began to ask local musicians such as Pat MacDonald (who later formed Timbuk 3) if they would like to play at the venue, but it was not until The Replacements were booked for two back-to-back shows that the venue became well known for live music. It was operated by "Cay" until her death in 1990.

Four of the children (Mike, Mary, Pat, Don) formed a corporation "Cayz Corp" and continued the business. They then leased the club to Cathy Dethmers from 1994 until 2001. Referred to in the press as "iconic" and the "CBGB's of the Midwest," O'Cayz featured many underground punk, grunge, and rock bands that later became major contributors to pop culture.

Indeed, at one time many touring bands had O'Cayz Corral on their bucket list of places to play. Some famous bands such as Nirvana, Soul Asylum and Living Colour only played there once. Other famous bands such as The Smashing Pumpkins only played there a couple of times or so, while bands like L7 graced the venue twice a year for several years—even after they were selling out stadiums elsewhere.

People best remember two events at O'Cayz, aside from the many fine performances there. A drunk truck driver smashed into and destroyed the front facade of the building, also killing a 22-year-old University of Wisconsin student and destroying the band Surgery's ambulance filled with their equipment. On another occasion, the floor caved in on the dance floor during a Royal Crescent Mob performance.

O'Cayz was destroyed by a fire that began in the 'Cay's Comic-Strip', a neighborhood bar at 502 East Wilson St., also owned by the family of Cay Millard, on January 1, 2001. Dethmers reopened nearby in 2004 as the High Noon Saloon.

Location 
O'Cayz Corral was located on the isthmus of Madison's near east side, a short walk from the state capitol, marking a transitional space between the capitol and the fashionable Jenifer-Spaight historic district. Despite the many up-and-coming, on the cusp of breaking-through musicians who played at O'Cayz before—and sometimes after—finding success, the physical plant was very small.  The primary section of the L-shaped space spanned only about 20 feet in width and 70 feet in depth, and accommodated a bar and several tables.

Featured artists 

Some of the bands that played at O'Cayz Corral between 1985 and 2001 (listed alphabetically with reference to any live recordings released of the show):

 7 Seconds
 7 Year Bitch
 24-7 Spyz
 60 Cycle Hum
 311
 The Afghan Wigs
 Agent Orange
 Alex Chilton
 Adrenalin O.D.
 American Music Club
 Animated Violence
 Appliances-SFB
 Archers of Loaf
 Arson Garden
 Art Paul Schlosser
 Asphalt Ballet
 At The Drive-In
 The Atomic Bitchwax
 Aunt Beaph  Video on YouTube of 11/13/98 show
 Babes in Toyland
 Bad Brains
 Bash & Pop
 Bazooka
 The BellRays
 Better Off Airport
 Beyond Possession
 Big Black 
 Big Hat
 Blanche Mobile
 The Blue Meanies
 Bongzilla Gestation, recorded February 7, 1998, was included on the Twin Threat To Your Sanity compilation released on 7", 7", and All Media by Bad People Records, Riotous Assembly, and Selfish Fucker Records in 2001. Trinity and Witch Weed were included on the He's No Good To Me Dead compilation released on Game Two Records in 1999
 Booty Fruit
 Boss Hog
 The Bottles
 Brian Ritchie
 Buffalo Tom
 Bugatti Type 35
 Bullet Head
 The Burning Ernies
 Buttress  Available on YouTube: 1992
 Calexico with Neko Case
 Cattleprod
 Camper Van Beethoven
 Camper Van Chadbourne
 The Celibate Rifles
 Cherubs
 Charlie Pickett
 Chemlab
 The Chesterfield Kings
 Chokebore
 Citizen King
 Clip The Daisies
 Clutch
 Clyde Stubblefield
 Coat of Arms
 Cop Shoot Cop Available on YouTube: 10/19/93 
 Cosmic Psychos
 Couch Flambeau
 Coven Of Thieves
 Corpuscle
 The Cows
 The Crossbones
 Cradle of Thorns
 Cruel
 Cub 
 Dazzling Killmen
 D.O.A.
 Damn The Machine
 Danger Prone Daphne Betty Page, recorded in January 1995, was included on Postpunkprelowfiposthifi, self-released in 1999 on CD
 Dash Rip Rock
 The dB's
 The Dead Milkmen
 Deerhoof
 Descendents
 Dick Dale
 The Didjits
 Die Kreuzen
 Dinosaur Jr
 Doctors' Mob
 D.R.I. aka Dirty Rotten Imbeciles
 Drug Induced Nightmare #4
 Dumptruck
 Droids Attack
 The Dwarves
 E*I*E*I*O
 Ed Hall
 Electric Hellfire Club
 Elephant Lips
 El Duce
 Elliott Smith
 Ethyl Meatplow
 Eugene Chadbourne
 Ex-Action Figures  The 18 minute-long live recording of The Mirror, Marina appears on the band's self-titled album, released on Mafia Money in 1996
 Exene Cervenka
 The Exotics
 Fat Tuesday
 Facing Mecca
 Festering Rinyanyons Swimmin' Hole 7" on Train Wreck Entertainment, 1993 included the live track It's Awlright!
 Fetchin' Bones
 Fear
 The Feelies
 Flat Duo Jets
 Flywheel
 Fire Town
 Firehose
 The Flaming Lips
 The Fleshtones
 For Christ's Sake
 Foreskin 500
 Fred Pepper
 Frightwig
 The Frogs Tour De Gay '88 was self-released on cassette in 1989
 Fu Manchu
 Fudge
 The Funeral Party
 Funland
 Fuzzdolly
 Gel-tones
 Geraldine Fibbers
 GG Allin The first three songs on Insult & Injury Volume 2: The Bloody Years were recorded at O'Cayz Corral 8/7/86; however these songs were later attributed by GG Allin in another release as being 11/14/86. Teacher's Pet was released again on YouTube in 2023
 Glass Eye
 God and Texas
 God Bullies
 The Gomers
 Government Issue
 Green
 Green Day (Note: There are many media citations but no actual evidence of any show or even a date)
 Guzzard
 Half Japanese
 Hammerhead
 Hand Over Head
 Helios Creed
 Helmet
 Hole
 Homo Erectus
 The Honeymoon Killers The Honeymoon Killers Live! was recorded at O'Cayz and CBGB's. It was released in 1991 as a 7" on Munster Records
 Horny Genius
 House of Large Sizes
 Hum Machine
 Hüsker Dü
 Idaho
 Imminent Attack
 Impaler
 The Infants
 Inspector 12
 Iowa Beef Experience
 Ivory Library
 The Jayhawks
 The Jazz Butcher
 Jeffrey Lee Pierce
 The Jesus Lizard 
 Joan Wildman Trio Under The Silver Globe cassette was self released in 1989
 Johnny Thunders of New York Dolls
 Jon Spencer Blues Explosion
 Jonathan Fire*Eater
 Jonathan Richman
 Killbilly
 Killdozer  Available on YouTube: 10/6/89
 The Kissers On a Monday Night live CD released in 2001 on the Skeptic Rock label after the club burned down.
 Kyuss
 Ladybeard
 L.A. Guns
 Lemon Debby
 L7 The She Devils CD on Bullseye Records was a bootleg of the July 1, 1992 show;  released the same year. L7's Suzi Gardner brought her red mid '50s Fender Stratocaster with gold hardware to Smart Studios to record their breakout album Bricks Are Heavy, and then brought it to their O'Cayz show afterwards in December 1991. It floated around the club unclaimed for weeks. By the time the band realized the guitar had been left behind it had disappeared. It was never recovered.
 Last Crack
 Laughing Hyenas
 Legendary Pink Dots
 Less Than Jake 'The "Less Than Jake / Boris The Sprinkler / Sonic Dolls / Mulligan Stu compilation of the same bands were all recorded 10/6/96 and released on 8" flexi-disc the same year by Rhetoric Records and Fueled By Ramen
 Letters to Cleo
 Libido Boyz
 Life Sentence
 Little Blue Crunchy Things
 Live Skull
 Living Colour
 Loomis Available on YouTube: (Date Unknown)
 Love Battery
 Lunachicks
 Lyres
 Man Clam Chow
 M.I.A.
 Mad Trucker Gone Mad
 Madder Rose
 The Magnolias
 Man or Astro-man?
 Martini Gunmen
 Material Issue
 Meat Puppets
 Mecht Mense
 Megaloden
 The Mekons
 Melt Banana
 The Melvins
 The Mentors
 Mickey Finn
 Mike Watt
 Moe Tucker
 Mojo Nixon
 Mondo Generator
 Monks of Doom  One of their O'Cayz Corral shows was released on cassette by Static Attack Records in 1993.
 Mount Shasta 
 Moving Targets
 Mud Honey
 Mud Wimin
 Muscle Car
 Naked Aggression  The You Can't Get Me Down/Keep Your Eyes Open 1992 CD on Broken Rekids included four songs recorded live at O'Cayz Corral in May 1992 by Ken Udell. The multitrack recordings were never remixed because the band lost Udell's contact information. Instead they used a live cassette mix down and dubbed it to digital. The CD was re-issued as a cassette on Pop Noise in 1996. In 1998 the band released the Naked Regression CD on Broken Rekids including the same four songs as well as other songs recorded live between 1991 and 1994.
 Naked Prey
 Naked Raygun
 Nashville Pussy
 Natural Cause
 Nautical Almanac
 Nebula 
 Negative Trend
 Neurosis
 New Bomb Turks
 New Duncan Imperials
 Nimrod  1992 video of Nimrod with Queen of Noise/erotic actress Mayuko Hino released on YouTube: Part One, Part Two, Part Three
 Nine Pound Hammer
 Nirvana
 Nomeansno
 Nova Mob
 Old Skull
 The Other Kids Video available on YouTube: 1987
 Overkill
 Pachinko When The Going Gets Tough, The Tough Get Dirty was recorded at O'Cayz Corral with producer Ken Udell and became the band's debut release on Bovine Records as a 7" EP in 1992. However, the recording was made in the venue during the day, not during an evening show.
 Pansy Division
 Phantom Tollbooth
 Phil Gnarley and the Tough Guys
 Plasticland
 Playhouse
 Poi Dog Pondering
 Poopshovel
 Pop Defect
 Possum Dixon
 Poster Children
 Pound WI 
 Powerwagon
 Primus
 Psychedelicasi
 Queens of The Stone Age Available on YouTube: Video of You Can't Quit Me Baby 2/5/99 Audio of entire show 2/6/99
 Rapeman
 Railroad Jerk
 Rain Parade
 The Reivers
 The Replacements
 Resin
 The Reverend Horton Heat
 Richmond Fontaine Whiskey, Painkillers & Speed (Live On The Road) included the songs Madison and Made To Be Broken (a Soul Asylum cover), recorded 10/23/99 and released in 2001
 Rifle Sport
 Ritual Device
 Rockadiles, The
 Rollins Band
 The Rousers
 Roger Miller (from Mission of Burma)
 Royal Crescent Mob
 Ruins
 Run Westy Run
 Rusty Crayfish
 Salem 66
 Savage Republic
 Sevendust
 Scissor Girls
 Scratch Acid
 Scream
 Screaming Trees
 Screwtractor
 Season to Risk
 Seaweed
 The Sequentials
 Severin
 Shiv
 Shockabilly
 Shorty
 Silkworm
 Silverfish
 Skatenigs
 Skeleton Key
 Skin Yard
 Skrew
 Sleater-Kinney
 Slint Available on YouTube: 8/8/89
 The Slow Pedestrians
 Sludgeplow
 The Smashing Pumpkins The Rubano Tapes Vol. 1 and The Rubano Tapes Vol. 2 included a total of 5 songs reportedly recorded 1/5/90, 1/30/90 and 3/30/90. In any case, they were released in 2022 on Martha's Music as two sets of double vinyl LPs. More songs are available on YouTube: 3/30/90 
 Snakefinger
 Son Volt
 Soul Asylum
 Soundgarden
 Southern Culture On The Skids
 Space Streakings
 Sparklehorse
 Spooner
 Steel Pole Bath Tub Recorded by Ken Udell and released on his Static Attack label. A couple songs are also found on the NOISIA-VISION label that were then bootlegged onto a cd that played at High Noon Saloon.
 Sugar Shock
 Superchunk
 The Super Suckers
 Surgery
 Swamp Thing Available on YouTube: Video Rubber Bands 6/29/92
 Tad
 Tate's Blues Jam  Available on YouTube: Heartstruck Blues
 Tar
 Tar Babies
 Tav Falco
 The Three Amigos
 Thelonious Monster
 The Tragically Hip
 Thee Hypnotics
 Thin White Rope
 Thinking Fellers Union Local 282
 Thug
 Timbuk3
 Tiny Lights
 Today is the Day Blue Bloods was recorded at O'Cayz in 1998 and released on the Rage of Achilles label in 2002 on CD and LP
 Tool and Die
 Tortoise
 Tribe 8
 True Believers
 Turbonegro
 U.K. Subs
 U.S. Maple
 U-Men
 Unsane
 Urban Myth
 Urge Overkill
 Vampire Lezbos
 The Veldt
 Venison
 Violent Femmes
 Voivod
 The Vulgar Boatmen
 Walt Mink
 The Waterdogs
 The Weeds (WI)
 Ween
 Wesley Willis
 White  Available on YouTube: King Fat Sept 1993
 The White Sisters
 The White Stripes Video available on YouTube: Dec 1990
 White Zombie
 Wild Kingdom
 The Willies
 Willie Wisely The song Go was recorded and is available on YouTube
 The Windbreakers
 The Woggles
 The Young Fresh Fellows
 Xerobot
 XXX
 Yo La Tengo
 Zeni Geva Three songs digitally recorded 8/9/92 were included on Live In Amerika, a 1993 CD/LP on Nux Organization.

References 

Buildings and structures in Madison, Wisconsin
Music venues in Wisconsin
Punk rock venues